The COVID-19 pandemic in Ukraine has resulted in  confirmed cases of COVID-19 and  deaths.

The virus was confirmed to have spread to Ukraine when the country's first case was confirmed to be hospitalized in Chernivtsi Oblast on 3 March 2020, a man who had travelled from Italy to Romania by plane and then arrived in Ukraine by car.

An emergency was declared on 20 March 2020 in Kyiv Oblast, Chernivtsi Oblast, Zhytomyr Oblast, Dnipropetrovsk Oblast, Ivano-Frankivsk Oblast, and the city of Kyiv.

New infections and deaths started to break records by late October 2021. By then, a total of 2.8 million coronavirus cases and 64,936 COVID-19 related deaths had occurred in Ukraine.

Ukraine's ongoing vaccination program started on 24 February 2021 and from that day to 12 September 2021, 10,710,944 vaccinations were given in Ukraine (meaning 18% of the adult population of Ukraine had been vaccinated against COVID-19). About 44% of those vaccinated had been fully vaccinated. In an August 2021 poll 56% of Ukrainians did not plan to be vaccinated. Demand for vaccinations multiplied sharply by late October 2021. On 7 January 2022 the Ministry of Health announced that 44.9% of the adult population had undergone a full course of vaccination.

Statistics for the Russian-held Autonomous Republic of Crimea and city of Sevastopol, and for the unrecognized Donetsk People's Republic and Luhansk People's Republic in eastern Ukraine, are not reported by Ukraine's state agencies, and are not included in the country's totals.

Since the start of the 2022 Russian invasion of Ukraine, the Ukrainian Ministry of Healthcare has made no further press releases related to COVID-19, and the latest counts were for 23 February. As a result, daily counts are displayed in various diagrams as zero. In late May 2022, Chief State Sanitary Doctor Ihor Kuzin stated that since the beginning of the conflict, more than 750 studies had been conducted and that COVID-19 outbreaks were not expected in Ukraine in the near future.



Background 
On 12 January, the World Health Organization (WHO) confirmed that a novel coronavirus was the cause of a respiratory illness in a cluster of people in Wuhan, Hubei, China, who had initially come to the attention of the WHO on 31 December 2019.

Unlike SARS of 2003, the case fatality ratio for COVID-19 has been much lower, but the transmission has been significantly greater, with a significant total death toll.

Timeline

January 2020 

On 27 January 2020, SkyUp, a Ukrainian low-cost charter airline, announced that it had suspended flights to Sanya, Hainan, until March.

February 2020 
On 4 February, Ukraine International Airlines suspended its charter service to Sanya Phoenix International Airport in Hainan. Initially, the suspension was set to last until 24 February, however the airline has not yet indicated when it will resume flights.

On 24 February, Boryspil International Airport and Kyiv International Airport were supposed to implement thermal screening procedures for travellers from Italy, but airport staff were either underequipped (with thermal cameras) or ignored the protocol.

March 2020 
On 3 March, Ukraine announced its first confirmed SARS-CoV-2 case, a man who had travelled from Italy to Romania by plane and then arrived in Ukraine by car.

On 12 March, two more SARS-CoV-2 cases were confirmed in Ukraine. The diagnosis was confirmed for a man in the Chernivtsi Oblast, whose wife had recently returned from Italy, and for a 71-year-old woman in the Zhytomyr Oblast, who had returned from Poland on 1 March. The woman, from Radomyshl, in the Zhytomyr Oblast, died on 13 March, becoming the first fatal case in the country.

On 16 March, two new cases were confirmed in the Chernivtsi Oblast, and two others in Kyiv. In Kyiv, one of the persons concerned was a student who had contacted the infected woman in the Zhytomyr Oblast, while the other was a woman who had returned from France.

On 17 March, six more cases were confirmed in the Chernivtsi Oblast, all of them had contacted the previously known case, including a 33-year-old woman who died. The first cases of children being infected were reported. One case was confirmed in the Kyiv Oblast, a man who had recently come from abroad, who was later confirmed to be a People's Deputy of Ukraine.

On 18 March, member of the Ukrainian parliament Serhii Shakhov stated that he was SARS-CoV-2 positive after denying it earlier in the day. Kyiv Post counted Shakhov as being among the total of 14 people in Ukraine with laboratory confirmations of being SARS-CoV-2 positive.

Later that day, two new cases were announced: the second one for the Kyiv Oblast (the wife of the man earlier reported) and the first one for the Donetsk Oblast (a 52-year-old man who had visited Egypt).

On 19 March, the third case was confirmed in Kyiv (a person who had travelled from Switzerland), and the second in the Zhytomyr Oblast (a 56-year-old man from Zhytomyr who had returned from Austria). The same day, the first cases were reported in the Ivano-Frankivsk Oblast and Dnipropetrovsk Oblast, also five new cases were reported in the Chernivtsi Oblast, thereby increasing the total number of infected in Ukraine to 26.

On 20 March, the first case of recovery from COVID-19 was reported for a man in Chernivtsi who was the first infected person in the country. On the same day, 15 new positive COVID-19 tests were confirmed across Ukraine: 10 in Chernivtsi Oblast, and one in each of Lviv, Ivano-Frankivsk, Kharkiv, Ternopil, and Kyiv, raising the national total to 41 cases. The case from the Kharkiv Oblast was a woman who had been diagnosed in Kyiv, and was being treated in Kyiv, and on 21 March was transferred from the statistics for Kharkiv to those for Kyiv.

On 21 March, according to the Ministry of Health, the total confirmed cases in Ukraine was 47. There were either six or seven new cases confirmed in Kyiv bringing the total to ten (of these eight had caught the disease abroad). In the Donetsk Oblast, the first case of coronavirus was recorded and an emergency was declared in the oblast. The first patient was confirmed in Lutsk, and in disputed Crimea. There were 417 people suspected of having coronavirus in Crimea and Sevastopol at the end of 21 March.

As of 10:00 on 23 March, there were 73 confirmed cases in Ukraine. During the previous 24 hours, 26 new cases were confirmed.

As of 10:00 on 24 March 11 new cases had been confirmed in Ukraine during the previous 24 hours, bringing the total to 84 confirmed cases. This was later raised to 97 confirmed cases. The head of the Chernivtsi Oblast state administration, Serhiy Osachuk, said that 13 new cases of the disease had been confirmed in Chernivtsi Oblast. There were 38 infected people in the Ukrainian part of Bukovina.

At 10:00 on 25 March, the Ministry of Health stated that 29 new cases had been confirmed in Ukraine during the previous 24 hours, bringing the total to 113 confirmed cases. These included the first case in the Volyn Oblast, the first two cases in the Zaporizhzhia Oblast, two more cases in Kyiv, seven more in the Kyiv Oblast, the first case in the Luhansk Oblast, the first case in the Odesa Oblast, two more cases in the Ternopil Oblast, and 13 new cases in the Chernivtsi Oblast that had been reported in the media the previous day. One person in the Ternopil Oblast died of the disease.

On 25 March, the Government introduced a 30-day emergency regime across Ukraine that was scheduled planned to end on 24 April.

At 10:00 on 26 March, the Ministry of Health stated that 43 new cases had been confirmed in Ukraine during the previous 24 hours, bringing the total to 156 confirmed cases. One person in the Ivano-Frankivsk Oblast died of the disease. By the end of 26 March, there were five confirmed cases in Sevastopol, and nine in the rest of Crimea; over 3,000 people were suspected of having the disease, and nearly 90 were isolated in hospitals in Crimea (including Sevastopol).

At 10:00 on 27 March, the Ministry announced that 62 more cases had been confirmed in Ukraine in the previous 24 hours, bringing the total to 218 confirmed cases. Three more patients from Chernivtsi had recovered from the disease. This brought up to four the number of recovered people: three adults and a child. Repeated laboratory tests showed no trace of the virus, and another Polymerase chain reaction (PCR) test had shown a negative reaction twice in a row.

At 10:00 on 28 March, the Ministry announced that 93 more cases had been confirmed in Ukraine in the previous 24 hours, bringing the total to 311 confirmed cases. Three more people had died, bringing the total to eight. Another person had recovered, bringing the total to five (four adults and one child). There were reported cases in all parts of Ukraine, except the Kirovohrad Oblast.

At 10:00 on 29 March, the Ministry announced that 109 new cases had been confirmed, bringing the total to 418. There had been 248 new reports of suspicion of the disease, bringing the total to 1966 since the start of the year. Four cases had been confirmed in the Kirovohrad Oblast. The two cases (one per the Dnipropetrovsk and Mykolaiv Oblasts) shown in the statistics for 28 March had been moved to the statistics for Kyiv.

April 2020 
Since 6 April, wearing a face mask is required by the government in public places. In Kyiv, public places were clarified to include parks and streets.

On 21 April, it was reported that the Ministry planned to request an extension of the quarantine until 12 May, albeit with some exceptions, such as opening libraries and museums. A day later, the government extended the quarantine measures until 11 May; all measures remained in place, with the exception of granting access to public transport to potential blood donors.

May 2020 

On 4 May, the Ukrainian government extended the quarantine until 22 May.

A number of restrictions were lifted on 11 May. These included the re-opening of parks, squares, recreation areas, beauty salons, hairdressers and barber shops, cafes and restaurants with outdoor tables. The second stage of easing the quarantine is currently scheduled for 22 May, which envisages the reopening of nurseries, public transport, and hotels, and allowing sports competitions to be held.

On 25 May, the metro systems in Kyiv and Kharkiv were reopened.

June 2020 
On 1 June, railway connections between a number of Ukrainian cities were re-opened.

Domestic flights resumed on 5 June, along with the reopening of restaurants, cafes and religious establishments.

International flights resumed on 15 June, but as of this date, Ukrainians could only travel to Albania, Belarus, the UK, US, and Turkey.

July–December 2020 
After the government eased restrictions, cases began to surge in August. The government passed some stricter measures, such as closing the country's borders. In mid-September, over 1,000 Orthodox Jewish pilgrims attempting to enter the country from Belarus were blocked from entering Ukraine.

Cases began to rise sharply from July which began to top 10,000 cases a day by November.

On 9 November, Ukraine's president, Volodymr Zelensky announced he had tested positive for COVID-19. He was admitted to hospital three days later. His spokeswoman said that he did this so that he could "accurately isolate and not expose anyone" although he said that there was "nothing serious" about his condition.

On 11 November, the government approved weekend lockdowns were non-essential businesses would close for the weekend for three weeks starting from 14 November.

On 23 December, Ukraine surpassed one million COVID-19 cases.

January 2021 
On 8 January, Ukraine introduced a new lockdown in an effort to curb high daily infection numbers. Ukraine lifted most of these lockdown restrictions, roughly three weeks later, on 25 January. The lockdown was largely successful, with Ukraine's Health Minister stating "Such statistics, which indicate the stabilisation of the situation, the improvement of the situation could be obtained only thanks to you, Ukrainians."

February 2021 
An antibody study done by Synevo laboratories showed that in January 2021 already 44% to 60% of all Ukrainians depending on region were infected compared to 33% in October 2020 and 9% in July 2020. The reported numbers of daily new cases and daily deaths had been decreasing since December 2020, but during this month, that trend reversed. Ukraine launched its vaccination campaign on 24 February after a slight delay. 500,000 doses of the AstraZeneca vaccine were received from the Serum Institute of India.

October–December 2021
New infections and deaths started to break records by late October 2021. On 25 October Ukrainian health authorities reported a record daily high of 734 coronavirus-related deaths and 19,120 new infections. The recorded previous high of 614 deaths was set three days earlier.

According to data from the Ministry of Health, by mid-December the number of infections was gradually retreating with twice as many recoveries per day as infections. On 11 December 238 coronavirus-related deaths were reported, 5,275 cases of infections were detected and 11.6 thousand people recovered from COVID-19.

Russian invasion of Ukraine (February 2022–present) 

As the 2022 Russian invasion of Ukraine broke out, there were concerns that COVID-19 may become a bigger problem moving forward, alongside a polio epidemic. In late May 2022, Chief State Sanitary Doctor Ihor Kuzin stated that since the beginning of the conflict, more than 750 studies had been conducted and that further COVID-19 outbreaks were not expected in Ukraine in the near future.

Vaccination

Vactination against COVID-19 in Ukraine started on 24 February 2021, but the tempo of vaccinating has been extremely slow compared to other European countries.

On August 30, 150,482 people were vaccinated against COVID-19: 50,690 people received a single dose, and 99,792 people their second. (The next month) in the week from 6 to 12 September, 921,443 vaccines were inoculated into Ukrainians (on 12September, 16,930 people received one dose and 28,218 people were fully immunized). This making the number of vaccinations given in Ukraine, since 24 February 2021,10,710,944. So 18% of the adult population of Ukraine had been vaccinated against COVID-19 by 13 September 2021. According to the official statistics of 6 September 2021, 7.6% of people over the age of 80 had received at least one dose of the vaccine, for people aged 40–59 this figure was slightly more than 19% and the most vaccinated group was people aged 18–19 years of whom 19.8% had received at least one dose of vaccine. On 14 October 2021 Prime Minister Denys Shmyhal stated that all of the country's adult population should be vaccinated against COVID-19 by the end of the year.

In August 2021 56% of Ukrainians polled by the Ilko Kucheriv Democratic Initiatives Foundation did not plan to be vaccinated. In the same poll 52% opposed mandatory vaccination against COVID-19. The same poll also revealed that 23% of those polled considered vaccination an effective means of protection against COVID-19. The most chosen effective methods of preventing coronavirus disease (according to the August 2021 polled Ukrainians) were "washing your hands after leaving the street" (54%), "keeping distance from others" (42%), "being attentive to their well-being and the health of others" (39%), and "wearing a mask" (36%).

Demand for vaccinations surged after new infections and deaths started to break records by late October 2021. From 15 to 21 October, almost 1 million people were inoculated in Ukraine. On 21 October 16% of Ukraine's population was inoculated. Making Ukraine still one of the least-vaccinated countries in Europe. On 23 October 2021 the Ministry of Health announced that 6.96 million Ukrainians had been fully vaccinated (out of a population of 41 million). An unknown number of Ukrainians had purchased an illegal fake COVID-19 vaccine certificate. (Sold from $20 to $200 with some costing as much as $380.) By 25 October (2021) 800 criminal cases for forged certificates or tests for coronavirus had been opened in Ukraine. Also on 25 October Ukrainian authorities reported a record daily high of 734 coronavirus-related deaths.

On 17 December 2021, the Ministry of Health announced that 46.1% of Ukrainian adults had received at least one shot of a coronavirus vaccine, while 41.3% of the adult population had completed their vaccination. Three days later the ministry stated that since the launch of the inoculation campaign 14,386,387 people had been vaccinated, of whom 14,386,385 received their first dose and 12,986,872 fully immunized (with two jabs).

On 7 January 2022, the Ministry of Health announced that 44.9% of the adult population had undergone a full course of vaccination.

By 18 January 2022, 131,178 Ukrainians had received a booster dose. Following the Russian invasion of Ukraine, the Ukrainian vaccination program continued, although on a much smaller scale with 50–60 thousand people being vaccinated in a week by late May 2022. Vaccination continued in all regions of Ukraine, except in Luhansk and Donetsk Oblast.

On 19 September 2022 the Ministry of Health announced the offer a third dose of the vaccine to everyone four months after their previous injection.

Cases by region 

The following information was reported as of 9:00 am on 27 July 2021:

Data from the occupied territories of Donetsk and Luhansk Oblasts, the Autonomous Republic of Crimea, and the city of Sevastopol is excluded from the daily updates by the Ukrainian Ministry of Healthcare. The unrecognized Donetsk People's Republic and the unrecognized Luhansk People's Republic report numbers independently, while Russia includes the annexed Republic of Crimea in its numbers.

Statistics 
In August 2021 the Ministry of Health reported that 80% of all Ukrainian deaths from COVID-19 had been people over 60. The report stated that, as of 14 August 2021, 53,255 Ukrainians had died of COVID-19, of which 43,566 were aged 60+. The share of people aged 60–69 among the dead was 29% (15,533 people), and for people older than 70 this percentage was 52% (28,033).

Charts

Total number of cases

Number of new cases per day

Number of deaths per day

New COVID-19 cases reported in Ukraine

Three different quarantine zones
The Cabinet of Ministers of Ukraine has set four different levels of epidemic danger:
the "green" zone; where there is a requirement for the mandatory wearing of masks in public buildings and transport
the "yellow" zone; where (in addition to the mask mode and the need to maintain a distance) mass events with the participation of more than one person per four square meters of the area of the premises or territory is prohibited, the congestion of cinemas and other cultural institutions by more than 50% of seats is prohibited, the congestion of gyms and fitness centers with more than one person by 10 square meters is prohibited and the work of educational institutions will be closed, except for those where at least 80% of employees have a "yellow" or "green" COVID certificate
the "red" epidemiological zone; where it will be prohibited to supply public catering (except for targeted delivery and take-out orders) and shopping and entertainment centers, cinemas, theaters, entertainment establishments, cultural institutions (except for historical and cultural reserves) film and video filming, non-food markets and shops, gyms, swimming pools and fitness centers, educational institutions, mass events (except for official sports events and matches of team playing sports without spectators), hotels, hostels, etc. will be closed;

These restrictions will not apply if all staff and all visitors, except those under 18, are fully vaccinated against COVID-19.

On 9 June 2021 all Ukrainian regions were set in a 'green' quarantine zone.

On 23 September 2021 all of Ukraine was set to the "yellow" zone.

On 15 October Kherson Oblast was classified as a "red" zone and on 18 October Zaporizhzhia Oblast, Odesa Oblast, Donetsk Oblast and Dnipropetrovsk Oblast were also made a "red" zone. On 23 October Sumy Oblast and on 26 October Rivne Oblast and Mykolaiv Oblast joined them. On 30 October 2021 Zhytomyr Oblast, Ivano-Frankivsk Oblast, Kyiv Oblast, Luhansk Oblast, Lviv Oblast, Khmelnytskyi Oblast and Chernihiv Oblast also become "red" zones. (The city of) Kyiv was placed in the "red" zone on 1 November 2021.

On 28 November 2021 only Zakarpattia Oblast, Kirovohrad Oblast, Ternopil Oblast, Kharkiv Oblast and Chernivtsi Oblast were in the yellow zone, Poltava Oblast was in the orange zone, and the rest of the regions had been placed in the red zone.

On 23 December 2021 only Zaporizhzhia Oblast and Volyn Oblast remained in the red zone and all other were a yellow zone. 7 days later Zaporizhzhia Oblast and Volyn Oblast also became a yellow zone.

On 29 January 2022, there were two regions (Ivano-Frankivsk Oblast and Rivne Oblast) a red zone, 16 regions (Vinnytsia Oblast, Volyn Oblast, Donetsk Oblast, Zhytomyr Oblast, Zakarpattia Oblast, Zaporizhia Oblast, Luhansk Oblast, Lviv Oblast, Mykolaiv Oblast, Odesa Oblast, Sumy Oblast, Ternopil Oblast, Khmelnytsky Oblast, Cherkasy Oblast, Chernivtsi Oblast and Chernihiv Oblast) were an orange zone and only (the city of) Kyiv, as well as Dnipropetrovsk Oblast, Kyiv Oblast, Kirovohrad Oblast, Poltava Oblast, Kharkiv Oblast and Kherson Oblast regions remained "yellow".

See also 
 COVID-19 pandemic death rates by country
 COVID-19 pandemic in Europe
 COVID-19 pandemic by country and territory

References

 
Ukraine
Covid
Covid
Covid
Volodymyr Zelenskyy
Covid
Covid
Covid